Crematogaster montenigrinus species of ant in the subfamily Myrmicinae.

References

montenigrinus
Insects described in 2008